Goodwin Steel Castings Limited is a heavy engineering firm located in Stoke on Trent, Staffordshire, England. The company specialises in the production of large, bespoke, machined steel castings.

History

Goodwin Steel Castings has been a supplier of machined castings since 1883. The foundry, with 180 employees, is supported by its sister company, Goodwin International Ltd, located 5 km away which carries out machining, fabrication and assembly work on the castings produced by the foundry. The Goodwin machine shop employs some 270 people in its modern CNC machining facility.

Goodwin Steel Castings Ltd, part of the engineering group Goodwin PLC, is the foremost independent producer of high alloy and high quality integrity castings in the United Kingdom.

The company has been in the casting industry since its formation in 1883. It is one of the 10 oldest companies listed on the UK Stock Exchange.

In 1984 Goodwins was the first steel foundry in the world to be awarded accreditation by the British Standards Institution to BS5750 (now ISO9001) for casting production and also for the computer simulation of casting feeding. In 2006 the company was awarded the Queen's Award for International Trade.

Capabilities
The company specialises in cast parts for suppliers to the engineering, nuclear, oil, petrochemical, and process industries worldwide.
Materials supplied include carbon, low alloy, stainless steel, heat resistant, duplex and super duplex stainless steels and super nickel alloys.

They supply machined castings from 200 kg to 10,000 kg as single pieces and up to 18,000 kg as fabricated single components. Welded assemblies up to 50,000 kg can be supplied.

Steel and nickel alloys are melted in the electric arc furnace and can be processed through the AOD refining vessel.

Applications
Goodwin castings are used in a variety of projects. Some of the more high-profile projects are listed below.

Bridges
Hardanger Bridge
Oakland Bay Bridge Eastern Span Replacement
Tsing Ma Bridge
Jiangyin Bridge

Structural/Architectural
Faslane Naval Base
Stratford station
Ludwig Erhard Haus
Paddington station

Power Generation (including Nuclear)
Pelamis Wave Energy Converter
Sizewell B nuclear power station
Sellafield re-processing plant

Other

Development
Goodwin have been heavily involved in Nickel alloy development programs for fossil fuel power plants for Advanced Super Critical Applications (A-USC).
These projects include:
Thermie AD700
COMTES
Pacific Basin 700 research
European NextGenPower
MacPlus

References

External links 
 Goodwin Steel Castings

Companies based in Stoke-on-Trent
British companies established in 1883
Engineering companies of the United Kingdom
Companies listed on the London Stock Exchange
Manufacturing companies established in 1883
1883 establishments in England